Rain, Part 3 is a live EP from Planetshakers. This album was released on 9 August 2019 by Planetshakers Ministries International and Venture3Media.

Critical reception

Lins Honeyman gave the EP a score of six out of ten for Cross Rhythms.
Joni Davies gave the EP a four and half star review in Louder Than the Music.

Track listing

References

2019 live albums
Planetshakers albums